Alfred Whittingham (19 June 1914 – 1993) was a professional footballer, who played for Bradford City, Huddersfield Town and Halifax Town. He was born in Altofts, West Yorkshire.

During World War II, Whittingham made 78 guest appearances for Southampton, scoring 84 goals; on 16 January 1943 he scored eight goals in an 11–0 victory over Luton Town.

References

1914 births
1993 deaths
English footballers
People from Altofts
English Football League players
Association football forwards
Bradford City A.F.C. players
Huddersfield Town A.F.C. players
Halifax Town A.F.C. players
Southampton F.C. wartime guest players